Ellen Jane Carr (born 13 August 1950) is an English actress. She is well known for her first film role as Mary McGregor in drama The Prime of Miss Jean Brodie (1969) and the voice role of "Pud'n" on the animated The Grim Adventures of Billy and Mandy (US, 2001–2007). She also played a character called "Pudding" in the Jilly Cooper-penned BBC sitcom It's Awfully Bad For Your Eyes, Darling (UK, 1971).

Early life
Carr was born in Loughton, Essex, England, the daughter of Patrick Carr, a steel erector and Gwendoline Rose Carr (née Clark), a post office employee. She trained at the Arts Educational Schools in London.

Career

Film
Her earliest film role was as Mary McGregor in the 1969 British film The Prime of Miss Jean Brodie, directed by Ronald Neame from a screenplay written by Jay Presson Allen, adapted from her own stage play, which was based in turn on the 1961 novel of the same name by Muriel Spark. In this role, like her fellow young actors, she had to portray the character at ages ranging from 11 to 18.

In 1970, she co-starred with Angela Lansbury and Michael York in Something for Everyone, and also starred in Danny Jones (1972) with Frank Finlay. Her other film roles have included the TV movie The Bunker (1981), Deal of a Lifetime (1999), Crazy as Hell (2002), Garfield: A Tail of Two Kitties (2006), Hannah Montana: The Movie (2009) as Lucinda, Editor of Bonchic Magazine, and The Five-Year Engagement (2012).  In 2014, she voiced Mrs. Goggins and Granny in Postman Pat: The Movie, and portrays Sister Serpent in the Halloween themed slasher film 31 (2015).

Stage
Carr received a Laurence Olivier Award nomination in 1977 for her performance as Mary Mooney in the comedy Once a Catholic.  She joined the Royal Shakespeare Company in 1978, receiving a second Olivier nomination in 1982 for A Midsummer Night's Dream and appearing in The Tempest, As You Like It, Much Ado About Nothing, The Merchant of Venice and The Merry Wives of Windsor. She played Wendy in the 1982 RSC adaptation of J. M. Barrie's Peter Pan at the Barbican in 1982 and appeared opposite Maggie Smith in the 1985 production of Congreve's The Way of the World.

In 1987, she moved to the United States while touring with the Royal Shakespeare Company's production of The Life and Adventures of Nicholas Nickleby.  From 2006 to 2009, she played Mrs. Brill in Mary Poppins on Broadway. Jane was part of the original cast of A Gentleman's Guide to Love and Murder, the Tony Winner for Best Musical in 2014. She played the part of Miss Shingle. In August 2014, she left the role and was succeeded by Carole Shelley.

Television
In 1980, she appeared as Rita in National Pelmet, series two opening episode of the drama Minder (UK, 1979–1994). She also had a prominent part as "Louise" in the TV series Dear John (1988–92).

In 1994, she played Timov (vomit spelled backwards), daughter of Al-ghul (Arabic: الغول, the ghoul), one of the three wives of Londo Mollari in the episode "Soul Mates" on US TV series Babylon 5. She continues to play occasional roles on television, including Fran Metzgar in Curb Your Enthusiasm (US, 2000), besides her voice work. In 2006, she served as both body double and voice actress of "Tabitha Lenox" on the US daytime drama Passions when actress Juliet Mills was on a brief vacation.

In 2002, she played the part of Malcolm Reed's mother, Mary Reed, in the episode "Silent Enemy" of the TV series Star Trek: Enterprise. Carr appeared on an episode of Friends, "The One with Ross's Wedding", and on three episodes of Gilmore Girls. She has also had guest starring and recurring roles on episodes of many other US comedy shows including Wings, Caroline in the City, Monk, Ellen, Becker, Dharma & Greg, Mad About You, and three episodes of Curb Your Enthusiasm.

In 2011, Carr played a resident of the apartment building Alex and Harper lived in on Wizards of Waverly Place. In 2012, she again played a nanny, this time as Mrs. Buckminster in a Season 8 episode of How I Met Your Mother. In 2018–19, she appeared as Tabitha, the fairy godmother, on five episodes of Legends of Tomorrow.

In 2020, Carr had a guest role as Betty on the CBS sitcom Mom (Season 8 Episode 3 - "Tang and a Safe Space for Everybody").

Voice acting
In 1985, she voiced the dual role of Computer and its Inner Voice in the Doctor Who radio series Slipback (UK, 1985). In 2008, she voiced the character of Grandma Winifred Fletcher in the American Disney animated television series Phineas and Ferb. She also voiced Lady Cecelia in Familias Regnant universe Heris Serrano trilogy graphic audio book.

She also provides the voice of Cosmo's mother Mama Cosma in the Nickelodeon animated series The Fairly OddParents.

Partial filmography

References

External links

1950 births
Living people
English film actresses
English musical theatre actresses
English television actresses
English voice actresses
People from Loughton
20th-century English actresses
21st-century English actresses